Lake Dai, also known by its Chinese name Daihai, is a lake in Liangcheng County, Ulanqab Prefecture, Inner Mongolia, China.

Geography

History
Under the Qin, Huangqi and Dai lakes formed the northern boundaries of Yanmen Commandery, marking part of the northern frontier of the Chinese empire.

References

Citations

Bibliography
 .

External links

Dai
Dai